

Facilities
 Toronto Yard in Toronto, Ontario
 Vancouver, British Columbia
 Alyth Yard in Calgary, Alberta
 Moose Jaw, Saskatchewan
 Edmonton, Alberta
 CPR Buffalo Yard
 Chicago, Illinois
 St. Paul, Minnesota
 Glenwood, Minnesota
 Saskatoon, Saskatchewan
 Winnipeg, Manitoba
 Thunder Bay, Ontario
 Montreal, Quebec
 Binghamton, New York
 Enderlin, North Dakota
 Harvey, North Dakota
 Elkhart, Indiana
 Thief River Falls, Minnesota
 Portage, Wisconsin

Repair yards
 Vancouver, British Columbia
 Golden, British Columbia
 Calgary, Alberta
 Moose Jaw, Saskatchewan
 Chicago, Illinois
 St. Paul, Minnesota
 Montreal, Quebec
 Binghamton, New York
 CPR Toronto Yard Repair Ships - Toronto, Ontario

Grain elevators
Mahnomen (MN) - Cenex Harvest States Coop 
Plummer (MN) - Red River Grain 
Elbow Lake (MN) - Elbow Lake Coop Grain - Grain Elevator
Kensington (MN) - Farmers Elevator 
Parkers Prairie (MN) - Pro-Ag Farmers Coop 
Karlstad (MN) - Karlstad Farmers Elevator
Belgrade (MN) - Belgrade Grain Inc.
Thief River Falls (MN) - Farmers Coop Grain & Seed Association
Brooten (MN) - Central Minnesota Coop
Wendell (MN) - Wendell Farmers Elevator Co
Grain Elevator - Winger (MN) - Farmers Cooperative Co - Grain Elevator
Grain Elevator - Oslo (MN) - Valley Growers Grain Co., LLC - Grain Elevator
Grain Elevator - Brooks (MN) - Oklee Farmers Coop Elevator - Grain Elevator
Grain Elevator - Callaway (MN) - Cenex Harvest States Coop - Grain Elevator
Grain Elevator - Oklee (MN) - Oklee Farmers Coop Elevator - Grain Elevator
Grain Elevator - Glenwood (MN) - Prairie Lakes Coop - Grain Elevator
Grain Elevator - Farwell (MN) - B&S Grain - Grain Elevator
Grain Elevator - Hazel (MN) - Northwest Grain - Grain Elevator
Grain Elevator - Hoffman (MN) - Hoffman Coop Grain Association - Grain Elevator
Grain Elevator - Alvarado (MN) - Farmers Elevator Company - Grain Elevator
Grain Elevator - Newfolden (MN) - Newfolden Coop Elevator Association - Grain Elevator
Grain Elevator - Henning (MN) - Henning Grain & Feed - Grain Elevator
Grain Elevator - Lowry (MN) - Harvest States Cooperative - Grain Elevator
Grain Elevator - Regal (MN) - Regal Elevator Inc - Grain Elevator
Grain Elevator - Strandquist (MN) - Newfolden Coop Elevator Association (Headquarters: Newfolden, MN) - Grain Elevator
Grain Elevator - Lake Bronson (MN) - L. B. Grain - Grain Elevator
Grain Elevator - Gully (MN) - Gully Tri-Cooperative - Grain Elevator
Grain Elevator - Tenney, MN (MN) - Wheaton-Dumont Coop (Headquarters: Wheaton) - Grain Elevator
Grain Elevator - Orleans (MN) - Orleans Grain - Grain Elevator
Grain Elevator - Minneapolis (MN) - ADM Soo Elevator - Grain Elevator
Grain Elevator - Warren (MN) - Northwest Grain of Warren - Grain Elevator
Grain Elevator - Barrett (MN) - Johnson Grain & Fuel Co - Grain Elevator
Grain Elevator - Waubun (MN) - Waubun Elevator Company - Grain Elevator
Grain Elevator - Radium (MN) - Radium, Inc - Grain Elevator
Grain Elevator - Whitetail (MT) - Whitetail Grain - Grain Elevator
Grain Elevator - Westby (MT) - Fortuna Farmers Elevator (Headquarters: Fortuna, ND) - Grain Elevator
Grain Elevator - Outlook (MT) - Farmers Elevator - Grain Elevator
Grain Elevator - Bisbee (ND) - North Central Grain Coop - Grain Elevator
Grain Elevator - Carrington (ND) - Peavey Grain Company - Grain Elevator
Grain Elevator - Cogswell (ND) - Gwinner Farmers Elevator (Headquarters: Forman, ND) - Grain Elevator
Grain Elevator - Fordville (ND) - Fordville Cooperative Marketing Association - Grain Elevator
Grain Elevator - Kulm (ND) - Farmers Union Grain (Headquarters: Edgeley) - Grain Elevator
Grain Elevator - Sawyer (ND) - Minot Farmers Elevator - Grain Elevator
Grain Elevator - Carrington (ND) - Cargill Inc - Grain Elevator
Grain Elevator - Kramer (ND) - Souris River Grain Coop - Grain Elevator
Grain Elevator - Geneseo (ND) - : Lidgerwood Farmers Cooperative Elevator - Grain Elevator
Grain Elevator - Hankinson (ND) - Farmers Mill and Elevator - Grain Elevator
Grain Elevator - Wilton (ND) - Wilton Farmers Union Elevator - Grain Elevator
Grain Elevator - Oswald (ND) - Oswald Grain Company - Grain Elevator
Grain Elevator - Mantador (ND) - Farmers Mill and Elevator (Headquarters: Hankinson, ND) - Grain Elevator
Grain Elevator - Underwood (ND) - Benson-Quinn Company - Grain Elevator
Grain Elevator - Devil's Lake (ND) - Lake Region Grain Cooperative - Grain Elevator
Grain Elevator - Harlow (ND) - Harlow Cooperative Elevator (Headquarters: Leeds) - Grain Elevator
Grain Elevator - Minot (ND) - Cargill, Incorporated - Grain Elevator
Grain Elevator - Bordulac (ND) - Kensal Farmers Elevator Company - Grain Elevator
Grain Elevator - Anamoose (ND) - Cargill, Inc - Grain Elevator
Grain Elevator - Kintyre (ND) - South Central Grain Cooperative - Grain Elevator
Grain Elevator - Forest River (ND) - Forest River Bean Co., Inc - Grain Elevator
Grain Elevator - Voltaire (ND) - Minot Farmers Elevator (Headquarters: Minot) - Grain Elevator
Grain Elevator - Nekoma (ND) - Nekoma Farmers Cooperative - Grain Elevator
Grain Elevator - Wyndmere (ND) - Garden State Bean - Grain Elevator
Grain Elevator - Gardena (ND) - Bottineau Farmers Elevator (Headquarters: Bottineau) - Grain Elevator
Grain Elevator - Crosby (ND) - Crosby-Noonan Coop Elevator - Grain Elevator
Grain Elevator - Adams (ND) - AGP Grain Limited - Grain Elevator
Grain Elevator - Overly (ND) - Overly Cooperative Elevator - Grain Elevator
Grain Elevator - Napoleon (ND) - South Central Grain Cooperative - Grain Elevator
Grain Elevator - Ambrose (ND) - Fortuna Farmers Elevator (Headquarters: Fortuna, ND) - Grain Elevator
Grain Elevator - Valley City (ND) - AGP Grain Limited - Grain Elevator
Grain Elevator - Kensal (ND) - Kensal Farmers Elevator - Grain Elevator
Grain Elevator - Kief (ND) - Sun Prairie Grain - Grain Elevator
Grain Elevator - Fredonia (ND) - Fairdale Farmers Cooperative - Grain Elevator
Grain Elevator - Braddock (ND) - Braddock Farmers Elevator Company - Grain Elevator
Grain Elevator - Benedict (ND) - McLean Elevator Company - Grain Elevator
Grain Elevator - Lansford (ND) - Souris River Grain Coop - Grain Elevator
Grain Elevator - Southam (ND) - Southam Elevator - Grain Elevator
Grain Elevator - Falkirk (ND) - Farmers Elevator Company - Grain Elevator
Grain Elevator - Forest River (ND) - Farmers Elevator - Grain Elevator
Grain Elevator - Norma (ND) - Sun Prairie Grain - Grain Elevator
Grain Elevator - Enderlin (ND) - Enderlin Farmers Elevator - Grain Elevator
Grain Elevator - Wishek (ND) - Wishek Farmers Elevator - Grain Elevator
Grain Elevator - Leal (ND) - Wimbledon Grain Company - Grain Elevator
Grain Elevator - Dahlen (ND) - Dahlen Farmers Elevator & Oil Company - Grain Elevator
Grain Elevator - Valley City (ND) - Miller Elevator (Loadouts: Cathay, Cuba & Fingal) - Grain Elevator
Grain Elevator - Fullerton (ND) - Fullerton Farmers Elevator - Grain Elevator
Grain Elevator - Bismarck (ND) - Heartland, Incorporated - Grain Elevator
Grain Elevator - Manfred (ND) - Fessenden Cooperative Elevator Company (Headquarters: Fessenden, ND) - Grain Elevator
Grain Elevator - Alsen (ND) - Alsen Farmers Elevator - Grain Elevator
Grain Elevator - Valley City (ND) - Peavey Grain Company - Grain Elevator
Grain Elevator - Garrison (ND) - Farmers Union elevator - Grain Elevator
Grain Elevator - Agate (ND) - North Central Grain Coop (Headquarters: Bisbee, ND) - Grain Elevator
Grain Elevator - Minot (ND) - Sun Prairie Grain - Grain Elevator
Grain Elevator - Lankin (ND) - Harvest States Cooperative - Grain Elevator
Grain Elevator - Oakes (ND) - Harris Grain Company - Grain Elevator
Grain Elevator - Forman (ND) - Forman Grain - Grain Elevator
Grain Elevator - Calio (ND) - Schuler Elevator - Grain Elevator
Grain Elevator - Noonan (ND) - Crosby-Noonan Grain Company - Grain Elevator
Grain Elevator - Monango Crossing (ND) - Farmers Union Grain (Headquarters: Edgeley) - Grain Elevator
Grain Elevator - Russell (ND) - Souris River Grain Coop - Grain Elevator
Grain Elevator - Drake (ND) - Minot Farmers Elevator - Grain Elevator
Grain Elevator - Greene (ND) - Farmers Elevator Company of Green - Grain Elevator
Grain Elevator - Oakes (ND) - Garden State Bean Company - Grain Elevator
Grain Elevator - Oakes (ND) - Oakes Grain - Grain Elevator
Grain Elevator - New Town (ND) - Dakota Quality Grain Cooperative - Grain Elevator
Grain Elevator - Forman (ND) - Gwinner Farmers Elevator - Grain Elevator
Grain Elevator - Fessenden (ND) - Fessenden Cooperative Assn - Grain Elevator
Grain Elevator - Fairmount (ND) - Demson Elevator Cooperative - Grain Elevator
Grain Elevator - Wishek (ND) - South Central Grain Cooperative - Grain Elevator
Grain Elevator - Cuba (ND) - Miller Elevator Company - Grain Elevator
Grain Elevator - Norway Spur (ND) - Norway Spur Farmers Coop - Grain Elevator
Grain Elevator - Devil's Lake (ND) - Peavey Company - Grain Elevator
Grain Elevator - Carpio (ND) - Berthold Farmers Elevator - Grain Elevator
Grain Elevator - Ryder (ND) - Farmers Union Elevator Co of Minot (Headquarters: Minot, ND) - Grain Elevator
Grain Elevator - Plaza (ND) - Plaza/Makoti Equity - Grain Elevator
Grain Elevator - Parshall (ND) - Dakota Quality Grain Coop - Grain Elevator
Grain Elevator - Fortuna (ND) - Fortuna Farmers Elevator - Grain Elevator
Grain Elevator - Velva (ND) - Farmers Union Elevator Co - Grain Elevator
Grain Elevator - Max (ND) - Max Farmers Elevator Company - Grain Elevator
Grain Elevator - Lidgerwood (ND) - Farmers Cooperative Elevator - Grain Elevator
Grain Elevator - Minot (ND) - Minot Farmers Elevator Company - Grain Elevator
Grain Elevator - Fairdale (ND) - Fairdale Farmers Coop - Grain Elevator
Grain Elevator - Bowbells (ND) - Sun Prairie Grain - Grain Elevator
Grain elevator - Makoti (ND) - Plaza/Makoti Equity - Grain Elevator
Grain Elevator - Wimbledon (ND) - Wimbledon Grain Company - Grain Elevator
Grain Elevator - Lankin (ND) - Lankin Farmers Grain - Grain Elevator
Grain Elevator - Martin (ND) - Martin Farmers Elevator - Grain Elevator
Grain Elevator - Fingal (ND) - Miller Elevator Company - Grain Elevator
Grain Elevator - Tolley (ND) - Renville Elevator Company - Grain Elevator
Grain Elevator - LaMars (ND) - LaMars Cooperative Elevator Company - Grain Elevator
Grain Elevator - Fairmount (ND) - West Acres Grain - Grain Elevator
Grain Elevator - Courtenay (ND) - Harvest States Cooperative - Grain Elevator
Grain Elevator - Wyndmere (ND) - Wyndmere Farmers Elevator - Grain Elevator
Grain Elevator - Rogers (ND) - Benson Quinn Company - Grain Elevator
Grain Elevator - Veblen (SD) - Veblen - Grain Elevator
Grain Elevator - Hammer (SD) - New Effington Farmer Elevator (Headquarters: Sisseton) - Grain Elevator
Grain Elevator - Rosholt (SD) - Farmers Cooperative Elevator Company - Grain Elevator
Grain Elevator - Claire City (SD) - Harvest States Cooperative - Grain Elevator
Grain Elevator - Seneca (SD) - Breen Brothers Grain - Grain Elevator
Grain Elevator - Madison (WI) - Vita Plus Corp (Loadout: Fall River) - Grain Elevator
Grain Elevator - Fall River (WI) - Vita Plus Corp (Headquarters: Madison) - Grain Elevator

Grain terminals
 Savage (MN) - Cargill, Inc
 Red Wing (MN) - Continental Grain Company 
 Newport (MN) - Peavey Red Rock Elevator
 Duluth (MN) - Ag Processing Grain
 Duluth (MN) - Cargill 
 Minneapolis (MN) - River Services Inc 
 Savage (MN) - Port Bunge
 Winona (MN) - Benson Quinn Company 
 Albany (NY) - Cargill 
 Milwaukee (WI) - Didion Grain 
 Superior (WI) - CHS Inc.
 Superior (WI) - Peavey Connors Point

Automotive
 Calgary (AB) - Calgary - Automotive
 Winnipeg (MB) - Winnipeg - Automotive
 Windsor (ON) - Windsor (ON) - Automotive
 Agincourt (ON) - Agincourt - Automotive
 Windsor - E.C. Row - (ON) - Windsor (E.C.Row) - Automotive
 Montreal - St. Luc - Automotive
 Regina (SK) - Regina - Automotive
 Cottage Grove (MN) - Cottage Grove - Automotive
 Voorheesville (NY) - Voorheesville - Automotive

Intermodal

Edmonton Intermodal Terminal - Edmonton Terminal
Calgary Intermodal Terminal - Calgary Terminal 
Vancouver Intermodal Terminal - Vancouver Terminal 
Winnipeg Intermodal Terminal - Winnipeg Terminal
Vaughan Intermodal Terminal - Vaughan Terminal replaced the old CPR Obico Yard 
Dryden Intermodal Terminal - Dryden Terminal  
Thunder Bay Intermodal Terminal - Thunder Bay Terminal 
Lachine Intermodal Terminal - Lachine Terminal 
Regina Intermodal Terminal - Regina Terminal 
Saskatoon Intermodal Terminal - Saskatoon Terminal 
 Schiller Park West Intermodal Terminal - Schiller Park West Terminal
Bensenville Intermodal Terminal - Bensenville Terminal
Schiller Park East Intermodal Terminal - Schiller Park East Terminal
Detroit Intermodal Terminal - Detroit Terminal 
Minneapolis Intermodal Terminal - Minneapolis Terminal
Philadelphia Intermodal Terminal - Philadelphia Terminal 
Milwaukee Intermodal Terminal - Milwaukee Terminal